Wu Tsung-tsong (born 1955) is a Taiwanese politician.

Education and academic career
Wu obtained his bachelor's degree in civil engineering from National Taiwan University in 1977, and master's and doctoral degrees in theoretical and applied mechanics from Cornell University in the United States. He was a professor within the Institute of Applied Mechanics at National Taiwan University.

Political career
Wu served as deputy minister of the National Science Council under Chen Chien-jen. He returned to public service as minister without portfolio specializing in technology-related policy upon the presidential inauguration of Tsai Ing-wen in 2016. From this position, Wu commented on several aspects of digital infrastructure, including implementation of 5G telecommunications and the proliferation of fake news online. He served concurrently on the governmental Board of Science and Technology as a deputy convenor. Wu was retained in his post when William Lai assumed the premiership in September 2017. He remained as Su Tseng-chang replaced Lai in January 2019. Wu succeeded Chen Liang-gee as minister of science and technology at the start of Tsai Ing-wen's second presidential term.

References

Ministers of Science and Technology of the Republic of China
Living people
Cornell University alumni
1955 births
Academic staff of the National Taiwan University
National Taiwan University alumni
Taiwanese expatriates in the United States